The Maktab al-Khidamat, also Maktab Khadamāt al-Mujāhidīn al-'Arab (Arabic: مكتب الخدمات or مكتب خدمات المجاهدين العرب, MAK), also known as the Afghan Services Bureau, was founded in 1984 by Abdullah Azzam, Wa'el Hamza Julaidan, Osama bin Laden and Ayman al-Zawahiri to raise funds and recruit foreign mujahideen for the war against the Soviets in Afghanistan.  MAK became the forerunner to al-Qaeda and was instrumental in creating the fundraising and recruitment network that benefited Al-Qaeda during the 1990s.

During the Soviet–Afghan War, MAK played a minimal role, training a small group of 100 mujahideen for the war and disbursing approximately $1 million in donations from Muslims sourced via a network of global offices in Arab and Western countries, allegedly including approximately thirty in the United States.  MAK maintained a close liaison with Pakistan's Inter-Services Intelligence (ISI) agency through which the intelligence agency of Saudi Arabia, Al Mukhabarat Al A'amah, funneled money to the Mujaheddin. The MAK paid the airfare for new recruits to be flown into the Afghan region for training. MAK closely cooperated with the Hezb-e Islami Gulbuddin faction of the Peshawar Seven.

As the war ended, a difference in opinion emerged between Azzam and the Egyptian Islamic Jihad (EIJ) led by Ayman al-Zawahiri over the future direction of MAK.  Azzam wanted to use the wealth it had generated, and the network it created to help install a pure Islamic government in post-war Afghanistan and opposed "fitna" among Muslims, including attacks against governments of Muslim countries. Al-Zawahiri wanted to use MAK's assets to fund a global jihad, including the overthrow of governments in Muslim countries deemed un-Islamic. Bin Laden, MAK's most important fundraiser, was strongly influenced by Zawahiri, although he remained close to Azzam.

On November 24, 1989, Azzam was killed by the detonation of 3 mines, by unknown assassins. Azzam as well as his 2 sons were killed in the assassination on their way to their local mosque for evening prayers. Following Azzam's death, Osama bin Laden assumed control of MAK and the organization became absorbed into al-Qaeda. Suspects include bin Laden, Ayman al-Zawahiri, competing Afghan militia leaders, Pakistani Interservices Intelligence Agency, the CIA, the Israeli Mossad, and Iranian intelligence.

Connections in the United States
MAK established recruitment and fundraising offices in many Western countries, the United States being one of their main fund-raising destinations. On his fundraising tours Abdullah Azzam visited the mosques of "Brooklyn, St. Louis, Kansas City, Seattle, Sacramento, Los Angeles, and San Diego – altogether there were 33 cities in America that opened branches of bin Laden and Azzam's organization, the Services Bureau, in order to support the jihad."

Most MAK financiers and support networks fronting as charitable NGOs were shut down and designated shortly following the September 11 attacks and the subsequent signing of the Patriot Act.

Al Kifah Refugee Center
The first offices in the United States were established within the Al Kifah Refugee Center in Brooklyn, and at the Islamic Center in Tucson, Arizona.

The Al Kifah Refugee Centre in Brooklyn, New York, established in the mid-to-late 1980s, was originally operated by Mustafa Shalabi, a close associate of MAK's co-founder Abdullah Azzam. Al Kifah was originally established to aid the Mujahideen cause in Afghanistan, and garner both support and funding to fight the invading Soviets. By 1988, Shalabi had set up with two chief aids inside the Al-Farooq Mosque, one of whom, Mahmud Abouhalima, would later be arrested for the first World Trade Center Bombing in New York.

By one account approximately 200 "young Arab Immigrants" went to see Shalabi about fighting in Afghanistan. Once enlisted, the prospective jihadists would be organized into groups of three or four and instructed to "pay their own way". However, before leaving, the recruits were given arms and combat training; one such recruit was El Sayyid Nosair, who received rifle training at the High Rock shooting range in Naugatuck, Connecticut, and went on to assassinate militant Rabbi Meir Kahane in New York in November 1990.

In February 1991, Shalabi was found murdered inside his New York apartment.

It is believed that like Azzam, Shalabi had become embroiled in a power struggle with supporters of Bin Laden, namely Omar Abdel-Rahman (the Blind Sheikh) and his followers from the Al Farouq Mosque.  In 1995 Abdel-Rahman was convicted for his part in a plot, known as the 'Day of Terror Plot', to bomb various New York City landmarks.  It is also alleged that Rahman had intimate knowledge of the original World Trade Center bombing in 1993.

The subsequent investigations by the FBI into the Al-Farooq Mosque and Al Kifah Refugee Centre effectively dismantled the New York office of MAK.

CARE International
Established in the early 1990s as the Boston branch of The Al-Kifah Refugee Center, the head of the office, Emad Muntasser changed the name to CARE International Inc. following the 1993 World Trade Center bombing and dismantling of the Brooklyn office.

CARE International enlisted the use of various tactics in attempts to fundraise and recruit possible fighters. These tactics included, but were not limited to, dinner speeches and events at local mosques, donation "phonathons", open screenings of new Jihadist videos, a newsletter called "Al Hussam", and even university visits under the guise of Muslim Student Associations.

Muntasser applied as was granted a tax exemption from the IRS as a "non-political charity", enabling the organization to receive tax-exempt donations from around the United States. CARE was able to raise almost $2 million through small donations.

In 2005 prosecutors charged Emmad Muntasser, Samir Al-Monta, and Mohammed Mubayyid with conspiracy to defraud the United States and engaging in a scheme to conceal information from the United States.

IARA and ties to Mark Siljander
The Islamic African Relief Agency (IARA) was headquartered in Khartoum, Sudan and established over 40 offices around the world, including the United States.

The United States Treasury Department designated the Islamic African Relief Agency pursuant to Executive Order 13224 on October 13, 2004 for supporting Osama Bin-Laden and MAK (and subsequently Al-Qaeda). The designation cited one instance in which members of IARA accompanied MAK leaders on a fundraising trip to Sudan in which $5 million was raised for MAK.

Mark Siljander, a former Republican Congressman from west Michigan was indicted on charges of money laundering and obstruction of justice. Siljander was given $50,000 in payment by the IARA to lobby for the group's removal from a U.S. Senate list of terrorist-linked charities in 2004; however, it is uncertain if he ever engaged in any such lobbying efforts. Siljander was sentenced to one year and one day of prison after pleading guilty to obstruction of justice and acting as an unregistered foreign agent.

One day following the press release by the Department of Justice announcing Siljander's conviction, it released a statement of clarification regarding the former congressman's knowledge of the IARA: "It is important to note that the indictment does not charge any of the defendants with material support of terrorism, nor does it allege that they knowingly financed acts of terror.  Instead, the indictment alleges that some of the defendants engaged in financial transactions that benefited property controlled by a designated terrorist, in violation of the International Emergency Economic Powers Act".

Global Relief Foundation
The Global Relief Foundation was a purported charitable, nonprofit organization that was established and headquartered in Bridgeview, Illinois in 1992. Self-claimed to be the second largest Muslim charity within the United States, the group claimed to have raised approximately $5 million a year.

The Department of Treasury designated the group under E.O. 13224 stating in a press release in October 2002 that "the GRF has connections to, and has providing assistance for, Osama bin-Laden, the Al-Qaeda network, and other known terrorist groups" it went on to note that "One of the founders of GRF was previously a member of Makhtab Al-Khidamat".

Benevolence International Foundation
Founded in Saudi Arabia in the late 1980s as "Lajnat al-Birr al Islamiah" (LIB) by Sheik Adedl Abdul Galil Batterjee, the organization changed its name to Benevolence International Foundation (BIF) upon incorporating in Burbank Illinois, U.S.A in early 1992. During the Soviet–Afghan War, LIB, like many similar organizations helped to fund Mujahideen fighters. However, after the war LIB, now operating as BIF, helped to establish and fund Al-Qaeda.

Between 1993 and 2001 the Benevolence International Foundation is believed to have raised upwards of $17.5 million.

On November 19, 2002 the US Treasury designated BIF (as well as two other entities), as financiers of terrorism, citing the close relationship between BIF's CEO Enaam Arnaout and Osama bin-Laden.

Guantanamo captives alleged to have an association with Maktab al Khidamat

Notes and references

Further reading
 Gunaratna, Rohan. 2002. Inside Al Qaeda: Global Network of Terror. Scribe, Melbourne.
 Lance, Peter. 2003. 1000 Years For Revenge: International Terrorism and the FBI. Regan Books, New York.

Organizations established in 1984
Jihadist groups
Islamic political organizations
Rebel groups in Afghanistan
Organizations based in Asia designated as terrorist
Organizations designated as terrorist by the United States
Al-Qaeda
Osama bin Laden